Decimal system may refer to:

 Decimal (base ten) number system, used in mathematics for writing numbers and performing arithmetic
 Dewey Decimal System, a subject classification system used in libraries
 Decimal currency system, where each unit of currency can be divided into 100 (or 10 or 1000) sub-units

See also
 Metric system